South Tyneside College is a large further education college in South Tyneside in North East England. Its main site is in the town of South Shields. The college offers part-time and full-time courses for young students and adults. It was formed in 1984 by the merger of Hebburn Technical College and the Marine and Technical College, the latter founded in 1861 by a trust created by Dr Thomas Winterbottom, a former surgeon-general in Sierra Leone.

The college is still one of the largest merchant navy training colleges in the United Kingdom, and attracts students from as far afield as India and Africa. It offers courses in marine subjects marine education such as navigation, operations, mechanical and electrical engineering, communications, and catering.

The Marine and Technical College was formerly based in Ocean Road, South Shields, in a purpose-built building opened in 1869. This is now a public house called Kirkpatricks. There is a marine simulation centre on the main Westoe Campus and college sites throughout South Shields, such as: the Marine Safety Training Centre on Wapping Street; the Radar Station next to Ocean Beach Pleasure Park and the St. Hilda's Centre on Coronation Street. The former planetarium was closed in 2008, despite much local objection, and the space now houses a multi-faith chaplaincy. The college also used to own a campus in Hebburn however this was closed in 2011 due to upkeep costs. Also situated on the Westoe Campus, is the Dr Winterbottom Halls of Residence, otherwise known as "The Coronadrome". Opening in 1978, Dr Winterbottom Halls of Residence comprises six residential blocks, with the majority of the residents being marine students. It became a tertiary college in 1986 after the council's education reorganisation.

Sport

The college has had a rugby club since 1956.  This is now known as South Shields RFC after changing its name in 2015.  The club is based at the college and trains and plays its home games there.  The club currently plays at level 9 in the rugby pyramid and plays in the Durham/Northumberland Three division and in Durham County Cup competitions.  The club has three senior sides.

References

External links
 College website
 Historical records at Tyne & Wear Archives

Further education colleges in Tyne and Wear
Maritime colleges in the United Kingdom
Education in South Shields
1861 establishments in England